Elections to Cannock Chase District Council took place on 3 May 2012 on the same day as other local elections in England. A total of 14 councillors were elected from 13 wards as a third of the council was up for election. This also included a by-election in the Hagley ward which filled a vacancy that had arisen since the previous election. There were no elections held in the Hednesford Green Heath or Rawnsley wards as those wards elect only two councillors in the other two years of the election cycle.

The Labour Party gained the council from no overall control and became the first party to win an outright majority since the election of 2002. Compared with the results of the 2008 election when these seats were last up for election, Labour almost doubled their vote share and gained many seats they had previously lost to the Conservatives along with seats in Rugeley that had always previously been held by the Liberal Democrats. Three candidates from the Liberal Party stood in the Hagley ward, including one sitting councillor who defected from the Liberal Democrats, but they were not successful. The swing from Conservative to Labour across the district was 16.7%, a record for a Cannock Chase District Council election. The was the last election in which a party gained more than 50% of the vote until the Conservatives' landslide victory in 2021.

Results

|}

Council Composition
Prior to the election, the composition of the council was:

After the election, the composition of the council was:

Ward results
Vote share changes are based on the results achieved by parties in 2008 when these seats were last contested.

Brereton and Ravenhill

Cannock East

Cannock North

Cannock South

Cannock West

Etching Hill and the Heath

^ Diane Bennett was the sitting councillor for the Cannock West ward and previously defected from the Conservatives to the Liberal Party.

Hagley
There were two seats up for election in the Hagley ward due to the resignation of the sitting Labour councillor with the second placed candidate filling the remainder of his term.

^ The sitting councillor, Tony Williams, had previously defected from the Liberal Democrats to the Liberal Party.

Hawks Green

Heath Hayes East and Wimblebury

Hednesford North

Hednesford South

Norton Canes

Western Springs

References

2012
2012 English local elections
2010s in Staffordshire